Tony Garrett (1918–2017) was a British business executive, chairman of Imperial Tobacco.

Anthony Garrett or Tony Garrett may also refer to:
 Tony Garrett (born 1929), partner of Angus Wilson
 Sir Anthony Garrett, General Secretary and Chief Executive of the Association of British Dispensing Opticians
 Tony Garrett (reporter), wheelchair table tennis player, BBC reporter and Disability Executive for BBC Sport (once flew in tandem with Mike Bushell and Judy Leden at Airways Airsports)
 Anthony Garrett (criminal), whose conviction for murder has been questioned due to the use of torture by investigator Richard Zuley of the Chicago Police Department
 Tony Garrett, member of Australian indie pop band The Boat People

See also
 Antony Garrett Lisi, American theoretical physicist and adventure sportsman